Anancylus is a genus of longhorn beetles of the subfamily Lamiinae, containing the following species:

subgenus Anancylus
 Anancylus calceatus J. Thomson, 1864
 Anancylus mindanaonis Breuning, 1968
 Anancylus papuanus Breuning, 1976
 Anancylus vivesi Breuning, 1978

subgenus Paranancylus
 Anancylus albofasciatus (Pic, 1925)
 Anancylus arfakensis Breuning, 1959
 Anancylus griseatus (Pascoe, 1858)
 Anancylus latus Pascoe, 1865
 Anancylus malasiacus Breuning, 1982
 Anancylus socius Pascoe, 1865

subgenus Pseudanancylus
 Anancylus basalis Gahan, 1906
 Anancylus birmanicus Breuning, 1935

References

Mesosini
Cerambycidae genera